Abraham Lent (February 12, 1815 New York City – November 23, 1882) was an American politician from New York.

Life
He was the son of Peter Waldron Lent (born 1786) and Catherine S. (Forbes) Lent. He studied law for a time, but abandoned this, and became a merchant instead. On July 11, 1836, he married Susan Cooper (1816–1881), and they had two children. In 1850, he became a partner in a clothing manufacturing company.

He was a member of the Board of Councilmen (6th D.) in 1859, 1860, 1861, 1862 and 1865.

He was a member of the New York State Senate (6th D.) in 1866 and 1867.

Sources
 The New York Civil List compiled by Franklin Benjamin Hough, Stephen C. Hutchins and Edgar Albert Werner (1870; pg. 444)
 Life Sketches of the State Officers, Senators, and Members of the Assembly of the State of New York, in 1867 by S. R. Harlow & H. H. Boone (pg. 112ff)
 History of the Lent (van Lent) Family in the United States, Genealogical and Biographical by Nelson Burt Lent (1903)
 Manual of the Corporation of the City of New York by D. T. Valentine (1865; pg. 479)
 OBITUARY; ABRAHAM LENT in NYT on November 24, 1882

1815 births
1882 deaths
Republican Party New York (state) state senators
New York City Council members
19th-century American politicians